Coccothrinax montana is a palm which is endemic to Hispaniola.
The Latin specific epithet montana refers to mountains or coming from mountains.

Henderson and colleagues (1995) considered C. montana to be a synonym of Coccothrinax miraguama.

References

montana
Trees of Haiti
Trees of the Dominican Republic 
Plants described in 1929
Taxa named by Max Burret